Nancy Branch is a stream in Polk County, Arkansas, United States.

References

Rivers of Arkansas
Rivers of Polk County, Arkansas